Laurent Merlin (born 17 October 1984) is a French former professional footballer who played as a midfielder. He started his career as a youngster with the Olympique de Marseille reserve team, where he quickly progressed into the senior squad and earned two caps over two seasons with the seniors. Laurent was then snapped up by Corsica based French league team, AC Ajaccio. He got his first senior goal with the club before being loaned to LB Châteauroux and on his return was sold to Chivas USA.

Club career

Marseille
Born in Marseille, France, at the age of just ten, Merlin was training with hometown club Olympique de Marseille. From the youth team there he was able to make a name for himself, and soon found himself in Olympique de Marseille 2, the Marseille reserve team. Whilst at Marseille, Laurent only played in two matches and soon found himself surplus to requirements at l'Ohème.

Ajaccio and Châteauroux loan
In 2004 Merlin signed for fellow Ligue 1 side, Corsica-based, AC Ajaccio. At Ajaccio, he played twelve games in his first two seasons, ten more than when at Olympique de Marseille, a club at which he had been a part of the senior squad for two seasons. In these twelve games, he scored one goal.

In the following season, Merlin started one game for Ajaccio, soon becoming another back-up player.

In the early months of 2006 Merlin was loaned to lower league, French side, LB Châteauroux. However, he started three games before returning to Ajaccio.

Chivas USA
Merlin took part in Major League Soccer side  Los Angeles Galaxy's first ever open tryout in February 2007. The tryout was highly publicized in anticipation of the signing of David Beckham by the Galaxy. Through two days of intense competition with over 800 players from all over the world, he was one of two to survive four rounds of cuts and earn a trial with the Galaxy. However, he then signed for local rivals side Chivas USA. He played 22 games for the club, scoring one goal, before he was waived in 2007.

Cassis Carnoux
During the 2009–10 season, Merlin played for French Championnat National side Cassis Carnoux. He left the club following their relegation at the end of the season.

In July 2010, he had trials in England with Premier League sides Wigan Athletic and Blackpool.

Italy
In mid-2011 he left for U.S. Latina Calcio, Lega Pro 1 Divisione.

International career
Merlin was capped at under-17, under-18 and under-19 level by France.

References

External links
 

Living people
1984 births
Footballers from Marseille
Association football midfielders
French footballers
Ligue 1 players
Ligue 2 players
Major League Soccer players
Olympique de Marseille players
AC Ajaccio players
LB Châteauroux players
Chivas USA players
SO Cassis Carnoux players
French expatriate footballers
French expatriate sportspeople in the United States
Expatriate soccer players in the United States